The 2006 edition of the Vattenfall Cyclassics cycle race took place in the German city of Hamburg on July 30, 2006. The race was the continuation of the old HEW Cyclassics, which no rider has won twice.

General Standings

30-07-2006: Hamburg, 250.5 km.

External links
Race website

2006
2006 UCI ProTour
2006 in German sport